Junkovac may refer to the following places in Serbia:

Junkovac (Lazarevac), village in Lazarevac municipality
Junkovac (Topola), village in Topola municipality